Teflon Don is the fourth studio album by American rapper Rick Ross, released on July 20, 2010, on Maybach Music Group, Slip-n-Slide Records and Def Jam Recordings. Production for the album took place during 2009 to 2010 and was handled by several record producers, including Clark Kent, No I.D., The Olympicks, J.U.S.T.I.C.E. League, Lex Luger, Danja, The Inkredibles, The Remedy and Kanye West.

The album debuted at number two on the US Billboard 200 chart, selling 176,300 copies in its first week. It attained some international charting and produced three singles with moderate Billboard chart success. On its release, Teflon Don received generally positive reviews from most music critics, earning praise for its cinematic production and Ross' lyrical persona. Based on an average score of 79 at Metacritic, it is Ross's most critically acclaimed album.

Background 
In 2010, Ross announced to MTV that his next album would be entitled Teflon Don. On the remix to his earlier single, "Maybach Music 2", DJ Khaled hyped the album, along with "Maybach Music III". In April 2010, on his official website, he stated that "Super High" would be the first single. Artists Kanye West, Jay-Z, T.I., Raphael Saadiq and Drake were confirmed to be on the album. Producers for the album included West and No I.D.

Release and promotion 
The album was set for release on June 29, 2010, but was pushed back twice to a July 20 release date. It was released through Maybach Music Group and Def Jam Recordings. Ross supported the album with his international Blowin' Money Fast Tour.

Singles 
The album's first single, "Super High" featuring Ne-Yo, peaked at number 100 on the US Billboard Hot 100. Its music video received airplay on MTV and BET. The album's second single, "B.M.F. (Blowin' Money Fast)", was released on June 29, 2010, and features the rapper Styles P. The song reached number 60 on the Billboard Hot 100. The radio single was "Live Fast Die Young" which was sent to Rhythm/Crossover radio on July 13, 2010. It did not receive promotion and did not chart. The song "Aston Martin Music", featuring the Canadian rapper Drake and the American singer Chrisette Michele, debuted at number 98 on the Billboard Hot 100 after heavy downloads the week of the album's release. "Aston Martin Music" was released as the album's third single on October 5, 2010. It peaked at number 30, making it the highest peaking single from the album.

Critical reception 

Teflon Don received positive reviews from most music critics. At Metacritic, which assigns a normalized rating out of 100 to reviews from mainstream critics, the album received an average score of 79, based on 18 reviews, which indicates "generally favorable reviews". Critics noted it as Ross's strongest album at the time and found its production cinematic and "epic". AllMusic writer David Jeffries gave the album 4 out of 5 stars and viewed it as an improvement over Ross's previous album Deeper Than Rap, stating "Teflon plays up the chilled and soulful elements of its predecessor, meaning Ross has graduated to a level where words like 'organic' and 'poignant' come into play". Entertainment Weeklys Simon Vozick-Levinson called Ross "a competent rapper" and complimented his "ear for lush, expansive beats". Jon Caramanica of The New York Times described him as "a ferocious character, an impressive rapper... a clever and loose thinker" and wrote that Teflon Don "establishes him as one of rap's most potent and creative forces". Sean Fennessey of The Washington Post praised Ross's lyricism and wrote that he "is an enunciator of the highest order, his voice a tidal wave baritone... his word choice and onomatopoetic gestures... are unmatched in rap right now". Brian Richardson of Tiny Mix Tapes gave it 3½ out of 5 stars and wrote "he employs such confidence and panache staying within his limitations". XXL writer Rob Markman gave the album an XL rating and stated "if it is simply judged on the music, Teflon Don is damn near spotless. The lyrics are on par, the beats are lush, and the imagery is larger than life".

However, some critics thought that the album favored style over substance and criticized Ross's lyrics. Slant Magazine's Jesse Cataldo wrote that "despite fitful spots of brilliance, [it] feels distinctly swampy... too often comes off as a conspicuous mishandling of both assets and signifiers: too much drug posturing, too much repetition, too little real effort". OC Weekly writer Nate Jackson gave the album a C+ rating and stated "Ross squanders opportunities to expand the content of his verses beyond the digits of his bankroll". Nathan Rabin of The A.V. Club gave it a B rating and stated "Producers [...] provide lush, cinematic, larger-than-life soundscapes for Ross' crass consumerism, while classy guest vocalists [...] regularly outshine the star... the only thing deep about Ross are his pockets and his rumbling voice. Teflon Don excels as sleek, smooth, shiny pop escapism, pure and simple". Wesley Case of The Baltimore Sun noted his lyrics as "sleek, too-often shallow", but praised its "elegance" and "grandiose stunting". USA Todays Steve Jones gave the album 3 out of 4 stars and wrote that Ross's "booming voice and colorful tales of ill-gotten wealth are hard to ignore. His Maybach music always sounds good rattling the trunk, even if your ride is less ostentatious". Ian Cohen of Pitchfork compared the album's embracement of "an aura of dominance" to late-1990s hip hop music and elaborated on its indulgent Mafioso-themes and sound, stating:

Saxon Baird of PopMatters viewed that Ross's performance compensates for his "wet-dream fantastical lyrics" and stated "Ross is good at what he does and rap needs guys like him to liven up the party and get us hyped". Rolling Stone writer Jody Rosen complimented Ross's "gloating with wit and goofiness", stating "[he] pours out smart rhymes over sleek, synth-heavy beats". Tray Hova of Vibe lauded Ross's "penchant for exaggerated 16s and larger-than-life soundscapes" and "knack for picking colossal beats". Ben Detrick of Spin commented on Ross's assumption of his "kingpin" persona, stating "If the Miami rapper has been a shell, though, he's become Fabergé on Teflon Don, his fourth and best album. The songs here are baroquely structured, richly musical creations with humor and emotional depth". Jayson Greene of The Village Voice noted Ross's subject matter as "transcendent absurdity" and called the album "ridiculously extravagant and extravagantly ridiculous". Los Angeles Times writer Jeff Weiss gave it 3½ out of 4 stars and commended Ross's "chimerical mythologizing", while noting its sound as "beautifully constructed... a symphonic grandeur to match Ross' elaborate delusions". Steve Juon of RapReviews gave Teflon Don a 7.5/10 rating and wrote "Over a short but impactful 50 minutes of music, the gravelly guru of hustling expands his repertoire beyond debates about authenticity... he's still able to weave together dope beats with great stories".  was number 30 on Rolling Stones list of the 30 Best Albums of 2010.  Pitchfork placed it at number 38 on its list "The Top 50 Albums of 2010". In 2012, Complex named the album one of the classic albums of the previous decade.

Commercial performance 
Teflon Don debuted at number two on the US Billboard 200 chart behind Eminem's Recovery, with first-week sales of 176,300 copies. It is Ross's first album not to debut at number one in the United States. It also entered at number two on Billboards R&B/Hip-Hop Albums,  Rap Albums and Digital Albums charts. In its second week, the album dropped to number three on the chart, selling 63,000 copies. In its third week, the album dropped to number five on the chart, selling 39,000 copies that week. On November 10, 2010, the album was certified gold by the Recording Industry Association of America for sales of over 500,000 copies in the United States. As of May 2012, the album had sold 724,000 copies in the US.

In the United Kingdom, the album entered the UK Albums Chart at number 169, and also at number 23 on the Top 40 RnB Albums chart. In Canada, it debuted at number 17 on the Top 100 Albums chart.

Track listing 
Writers for Teflon Don adapted from physical edition booklet.

Notes
"Free Mason" features additional vocals from John Legend
Sample credits
"Tears of Joy" contains a sample of "Hospital Prelude of Love Theme" by Willie Hutch and an interpolation of "D.O.A. (Death of Auto-Tune)" by Jay-Z
"Maybach Music III" contains a sample of "Ancient Source" by Caldera
"Live Fast, Die Young" contains a sample of "If This World Were Mine" by The Bar-Kays, "Uphill Peace Of Mind" by Kid Dynamite and "Funky President (People It's Bad)" by James Brown
"Super High" contains a sample of "Silly Love Song" by Enchantment and "Gangsta Gangsta" by N.W.A
"No.1" contains a sample of "Hello Good Morning" by Diddy Dirty Money
"MC Hammer" contains a vocal sample of "Too Legit to Quit" by MC Hammer
"Aston Martin Music" contains an interpolation of "I Need Love" by LL Cool J
"Audio Meth" contains an interpolation of "Shook Ones (Part II)" by Mobb Deep

Personnel 
Credits for Teflon Don adapted from AllMusic.

 Chris Athens – mastering
 Chris Atlas – marketing
 Inderan K. Bailey – assistant
 Gabriel Bartolomei – drums
 Scott Berger-Felder – engineer
 Alex "Gucci Pucci" Bethune – A&R
 Jeff Bhasker – keyboards
 Chris Bonawandt – engineer
 Leslie Brathwaite – mixing
 Kidus Henok - A&R
 Adam Brooks – conductor, French horn
 Dee Brown – assistant
 Leesa D. Brunson – A&R
 Tanner Chung – cello
 Andre Cleghorn – bass guitar
 Andrew Colella – viola
 Andrew Dawson – engineer
 Ben Diehl – engineer
 Kaye Fox – vocals
 Samuel Gibbs – trombone
 Jacob Goins – violin
 Jaymz Hardy-Martin III – engineer
 Eldwardo "Eddie Mix" Hernandez – engineer
 Nate "Danja" Hills – producer
 Keith "Pika" Holme – stylistic assistant
 The Inkredibles – producer
 Derrick Jackson – trombone
 Rennie Johnson – electric guitar
 Darrel Jones – viola
 Terese Joseph – A&R
 J.U.S.T.I.C.E. League – producer, additional production
 Sang Kang – cello
 Gimel "Young Guru" Keaton – engineer, mixing
 Clark Kent – producer
 Khaled Khaled – A&R
 Anthony Kilhoffer – engineer
 Rob Kinelski – engineer
 Brent Kolatalo – instrumentation
 Anthony Kronfle – assistant

 Juliene Kung – viola
 Stephen Lawrence – violin
 John Legend – vocals, background vocals
 Ken Lewis – instrumentation
 Tai Linzie – artwork, photo coordination
 Andre Lipscomb – assistant
 Michael Lu – violin
 Lex Luger – producer
 Phil Mallory – bass guitar
 Jonathan Mannion – photography
 Deborah Mannis-Gardner – sample clearance
 Marlon Marcel – engineer
 Graham Marsh – engineer
 Connie Mitchell – vocals 
 Latoya Murray-Berry – stylist
 Edward J. "Uk" Nixon – engineer
 No I.D. – producer
 The Olympicks – producer
 Duncan Osborn – violin
 Joe Peluso – mixing
 Poobs – engineer
 Kevin Randolph – keyboards
 Remedy – producer
 Derek Roche – stylist
 Rick Ross – executive producer
 TaVon Sampson – art direction, design
 Ray Seay – mixing
 Noah Shebib – engineer
 Antonie Swain – trombone
 Matthew Testa – engineer
 Forrest Watkins – French horn
 Kanye West – producer
 Jonathan White – viola
 Edward Williams III – trumpet
 Tony Williams – – background vocals
 Brandon Wilson – trumpet
 Steve Wyreman – guitar
 Jordan "DJ Swivel" Young – engineer
 Tina Yu – violin

Charts

Weekly charts

Year-end charts

Certifications

References

External links 
 
 Teflon Don at Metacritic

2010 albums
Albums produced by Danja (record producer)
Albums produced by Clark Kent (producer)
Albums produced by J.U.S.T.I.C.E. League
Albums produced by Kanye West
Albums produced by Lex Luger
Albums produced by No I.D.
Def Jam Recordings albums
Rick Ross albums
Maybach Music Group albums
Albums produced by the Inkredibles